Richard M. Becker (April 16, 1931–June 24, 2007) was an American politician who served in the Kansas House of Representatives and Kansas State Senate.

Becker was originally appointed to the Kansas House on May 2, 1995, to fill out the remaining term of Gary Haulmark, who resigned his seat. In 1996, he ran for the 9th Senate district and won, serving one term before being replaced by Kay O'Connor.

References

1931 births
2007 deaths
Republican Party Kansas state senators
Republican Party members of the Kansas House of Representatives
20th-century American politicians
People from Lenexa, Kansas
Politicians from St. Louis